The Philadelphia 76ers, often referred to as the "Sixers", are an American professional basketball team based in Philadelphia. The Sixers play in the Atlantic Division of the Eastern Conference in the National Basketball Association (NBA). In seventy complete NBA seasons, the franchise has played in the Finals nine times and won three championships. The Sixers have the third-highest victory total and third most playoff appearances in NBA history. Since 1996, the Sixers have played home games at Wells Fargo Center.

In 1946, owner Danny Biasone founded the franchise as the Syracuse Nationals, a member of the National Basketball League (NBL). The Nationals qualified for the playoffs three times then joined the NBA in 1949, one of seven NBL teams to merge with the rival Basketball Association of America (BAA). The Nationals qualified for the playoffs in every season played in Syracuse, advancing to three Finals and Losing. For the 1963–64 season, the year following the departure of the Philadelphia Warriors for San Francisco, the Syracuse Nationals relocated to Philadelphia as the 76ers.

The franchise has played 57 seasons as the Philadelphia 76ers, with 36 playoff appearances and two championships. The Sixers acquired Philadelphia-native Wilt Chamberlain in 1964 from the Warriors and defeated Chamberlain's former team in the 1967 Finals, but suffered a sharp fall from grace due to the loss of Chamberlain to retirement and Billy Cunningham to the ABA: in 1972–73 the team won only nine games, the fewest in an 82-game NBA season. Under coaches Gene Shue and Cunningham, and the on-court leadership of forward Julius Erving, the 76ers returned as a power quite rapidly, achieving winning records in all but one season from 1975–76 to 1990–91. The Sixers won their last title in 1983 against the Los Angeles Lakers, sweeping them in four games.

During the 1990s, the 76ers declined to an 18–64 record in 1995–96 before popular high-scoring guard Allen Iverson led the team back up the table. In 2000–01 the Iverson-led 76ers won fifty-six games and defeated the Milwaukee Bucks in the Eastern Conference Finals to reach the 2001 Finals but lost to the Lakers four games to one in the best-of-seven series. The 76ers were a middle-of-the-road team on-court during the following dozen seasons, but by the early 2010s financial problems led incoming general manager Sam Hinkie to clean out any expensive players in order to save money and gain draft choices for the future. Lacking on-court talent, the 76ers set many records for ineptitude in the following three seasons, becoming the second NBA team after the 1995–96 to 1998–99 Grizzlies to suffer three consecutive seasons winning fewer than twenty games. In 2015–16 by going 10–72 the 76ers suffered the ignominy of having suffered the two all-time worst 82-game NBA season winning percentages.

Seasons

All-time records

NBA records

NBL records

Notes

Sources
NBA History, nba.com. NBA Media Ventures, LLC. Retrieved 2009-09-06.
Philadelphia 76ers, basketball-reference.com. Sports Reference LLC. Retrieved 2009-09-06.
Playoff Index, basketball-reference.com. Sports Reference LLC. Retrieved 2009-09-06.

References

 
seasons